X100 or X-100 may refer to:
 Curtiss-Wright X-100, an experimental aircraft with tilt rotors
 Fujifilm X100, a series of digital cameras
 X-100 (house), an experimental steel house in California
 Lotus M90 (also Lotus X100), a concept car
 New South Wales X100 class locomotive, a group of rail tractors built by Chullora Railway Workshops
 Rockman X100, a model of headphone amplifier by Scholz Research & Development, Inc.
 RT.X100, a real-time PCI video editing card
 Triton X-100, a nonionic surfactant
 SS-100-X, US President Kennedy's state car in which he was assassinated in 1963